Thomas Brown  (1811–1893) was a Scottish minister in the Free Church of Scotland who rose to its highest rank, Moderator of the General Assembly in 1890. He was a noted geologist and botanist. He wrote prolifically on the history of the Disruption of 1843.

Life

He was born on 23 April 1811 in the manse at Langton, Berwickshire in south-east Scotland, the son of John Brown, minister of that parish.

He trained in theology at Edinburgh University and began working as a minister in 1837 at Kinneff in Aberdeenshire. He left the Church of Scotland at the point of the Disruption of 1843. He spent some years without a ministry before being placed in the relatively prestigious Dean Free Church on Belford Road in north-west Edinburgh in 1849. He remained in the Free Church of Scotland for the rest of his life, serving as its Moderator for 1890/91 and the age of 79 in succession to Rev John Laird.

He was elected a Fellow of the Royal Society of Edinburgh in 1861. His address was then listed as 16 Carlton Street in Stockbridge, Edinburgh.

Edinburgh University honoured him with a Doctor of Divinity in 1880.

He died at home, 16 Carlton Street in Edinburgh on 4 April 1893.

Family

He  married  27  April  1848, Marianne  (born  30  November  1814,  died  9 December  1856 and whose brother was Alexander Wood),  daughter  of  James  Wood,  M.D., Edinburgh,  and  Mary  Wood  of  Grangehill, and  had  issue — 
John James Graham,  M.D., President,  Royal  College  of  Physicians, Edinburgh,  Lecturer  on  Neurology  in  University of  Edinburgh,  born  6  September  1853; died 1925
Mary Eleanor  Lucy,  died  in  infancy
James Wood,  M.A.,  minister  of  the  Free  Church, Gordon,  Berwickshire,  author  of  Covenanters of  the  Merse,  and  other  works,  born 2  December  1856,  died  at  Florence  16  March 1914.

Publications
See

Botany of Langton – part of the New Statistical Account of Scotland, 1834
A Sketch of the Life and Work of Alexander Wood MD FRCP (1886)
Commentary on the Gospels (1854)
Church and State in Scotland, 1560 to 1843 (1891)
Annals of the Disruption (1893)
A History of Berwickshire Natuaralists' Club (proceedings of the Royal Society of Edinburgh, 1893)
Annals  of  the  Disruption (Edinburgh,  1876,  1884,  1893)
Church  and  State  in  Scotland  from  1560  to 1843  [Chalmers  Lecture]  (Edinburgh,  1891)
"The  Game  of  Ball  as  played  in  Dunse  on Fastern's  Eve"  (A History of Berwickshire Natuaralists' Club,  vol.  i.,  44–6)
"Notes  on  the  Mountain Limestone  and  Lower  Carboniferous  Rocks of  the  Fifeshire  Coast,  from  Burntisland  to St  Andrews"  (Trans.  Roy.  Soc.  Edin., vol.  xxii.)
"On  a  Clay  Deposit .  .  .  recently observed  in  the  Basin  of  the  Forth"  (Trans. Roy.  Soc.  Edin.)
"Notice  of  Glacial  Clay near  Errol"
"On  the  Parallel  Roads  of Glenroy  "
"  On  the  Old  River  Terraces  of the  Earn  and  Teith"  (Trans.  Roy.  Soc. Edin.,  xxvi.)
"Address  to  Berwickshire Nat.  Club,  12th  Oct.  1881 " (A History of Berwickshire Natuaralists' Club,  ix.,  415–24)
Account  of  the Parish  (New  Statistical  Account,  xi.)

Bibliography
Obituary Notice  by  Prof.  Duns,  D.D.,  in  Hist. Berwickshire  Nat.  Club  (1892-3),  339-46
The  Border  Almanac  (1894),  76–8.

References

Citations

Sources

See also

1811 births
1893 deaths
People associated with Edinburgh
Fellows of the Royal Society of Edinburgh
19th-century Ministers of the Free Church of Scotland
Scottish Calvinist and Reformed theologians
19th-century Scottish writers